Uncorked is a 2020 American drama film, written and directed by Prentice Penny. It stars Mamoudou Athie, Courtney B. Vance, Niecy Nash, Matt McGorry, Sasha Compère, Gil Ozeri, Kelly Jenrette, Bernard David Jones, Melisia Lomax and Meera Rohit Kumbhani.

It was released on March 27, 2020, by Netflix.

Plot 
Elijah works at a wine business and at his family's local barbecue restaurant, where his father Louis and mother Sylvia also work. Louis expects Elijah to take over the business someday but he is not interested.

On a date, Elijah tells Tanya about how he became interested in wine, and expresses his aspiration of becoming a master sommelier. Tanya encourages him to pursue his dream. Elijah takes an entrance exam for the Master Sommelier program and passes it, earning admittance to a sommelier school.

The class is invited to an exchange program in Paris, but Elijah realizes he won't be able to afford it. Classmate Harvard agrees to split with him and Elijah raises the rest of the money he needs through fundraising. While in Paris, Elijah learns about Sylvia's cancer diagnosis, but she tells him to stay in France and wires him money despite Louis's disapproval.

Sylvia dies, and Elijah returns home for the funeral. He begins missing classes for his sommelier program in order to help Louis at the family restaurant. Eventually, Elijah is forced to withdraw from the program.

Louis gives in and, with Tanya, helps Elijah study for the master sommelier exam. Elijah takes his exam and later finds out that he did not pass. He returns to his two jobs. Sometime thereafter, Elijah reenrolls in the sommelier program.

Cast
 Mamoudou Athie as Elijah
 Courtney B. Vance as Louis
 Niecy Nash as Sylvia
 Matt McGorry as Harvard
 Sasha Compère as Tanya
 Gil Ozeri as Richie
 Kelly Jenrette as Brenda
 Bernard David Jones as JT
 Melisia Lomax as Boo
 Meera Rohit Kumbhani as Leann
 Matthew Glave as Raylan
 Princeton James as Newton

Production
In November 2018, it was announced Niecy Nash, Courtney B. Vance and Mamoudou Athie had joined the cast of the film, with Prentice Penny directing from a screenplay he wrote. Penny, Datari Turner, Chris Pollock, Jason Michael Berman, Jill Ahrens, Ryan Ahrens, Ben Renzo will serve as producers, while Patrick Raymond, Veronica Nickel, Drew Brees and Tony Parker will serve as executive producers, under their Forge Media, Mandalay Pictures, and Argent Pictures banners, respectively. In December 2018, Kelly Jenrette, Matt McGorry, Gil Ozeri, and Bernard David Jones joined the cast of the film.

Filming
Principal photography began on November 10, 2018, in Memphis, Tennessee. Production concluded on December 11, 2018.

Release
It was scheduled to have its world premiere at South by Southwest on March 14, 2020. However, the film was pulled from the festival due to the COVID-19 pandemic. It was released on March 27, 2020, by Netflix.

Critical reception
Uncorked received positive reviews from film critics. The website's critical consensus reads, "Like a good wine, once you let Uncorked breathe, its heartfelt tenderness will yield a sweet time." On Metacritic, the film holds a rating of 62 out of 100, based on 14 critics, indicating "generally favorable reviews".

John DeFore of The Hollywood Reporter gave the film a positive review writing: "Vance and Athie create characters worth our attention, and the script's realistic handling of their conflict pulls Uncorked through its lulls." Michael Rechtshaffen of The Los Angeles Times also gave the film a positive review writing: "Penny has crafted a thoroughly workable and well-informed vehicle, providing a nurturing atmosphere for the unhurried dramatic developments and uniformly gracious performances." Anna Menta of Decider gave the film a positive review writing: "Vance and Nash are a freakin' delight in this movie and any moment that either of them is on the screen is a moment very much enjoyed indeed."

Benjamin Lee of The Guardian gave the film 2 out of 5 stars writing: "There's not enough special sauce here to make it linger, it's a palate cleanser at best."

Reviewers who approached the film from a wine background gave it a generally average score making such comments as, "every now and then, it really hit the spot" and "the film overall falls rather flat and while possibly of interest to wine people, it's not going to be 'the next Sideways'". Black sommelier Michaelangelo Wescott criticized it for only touching lightly on the racism within the industry.

References

External links
 
 
 

2020 films
American drama films
English-language Netflix original films
Cooking films
Films about chefs
Films about wine
2020s English-language films
2020s American films